New Caledonia is an overseas territory of France in the south Pacific

New Caledonia may also refer to:
 New Caledonia (Canada), a former North American fur-trading district
 College of New Caledonia, with six campuses in British Columbia, Canada

See also
 Caledonia (disambiguation)
 New Scotland (disambiguation)
 Nova Scotia (disambiguation)
 New Albany (disambiguation)